The Children's Institute of Pittsburgh is a nonprofit organization dedicated to children with special needs and their families in Western Pennsylvania and Pittsburgh, Pennsylvania, United States.

Mary Irwin Laughlin founded The Children's Institute in 1902 as the Memorial Home for Crippled Children to care for a six-year-old boy whose legs had been severed in a train accident. Later called The Rehabilitation Institute, the hospital at The Children's Institute, today, is a leader in pediatric rehabilitation techniques and provides individualized treatment programs along a broad continuum of care: inpatient care, outpatient care, transitional and subacute care, and home care. The Children's Institute also has The Day School, an accredited private school for students with special needs, Project STAR, a social services component dedicated to supporting and finding permanent homes for children with special needs, and a Therapeutic Garden, accessible to children at the Institute and the public.

The Children's Institute's main campus is located at 1405 Shady Avenue in the Squirrel Hill neighborhood of Pittsburgh, and the hospital's satellite facilities are located at Wexford, Green Tree and Norwin Hills. Project STAR at The Children's Institute has offices in Wilkinsburg, Pennsylvania, and Monaca, Pennsylvania.

Hospital
The Children's Institute provides pediatric rehabilitation to children and adolescents from birth to age twenty-one. It is the "only free-standing pediatric rehabilitation specialty hospital in Pennsylvania, and one of only twenty in the country." The Hospital offers specialty programs such as aquatic therapy, assistive therapy, augmentative and alternative communication, autism therapies, brain injury rehabilitation, diabetes management, functional feeding, obesity management, orthopedic rehabilitation, end of life and palliative care, a pediatric cardiac recovery program, respite care, RND (reflex neurovascular dystrophy) and pain rehabilitation, spinal cord rehabilitation, and a Prader–Willi Syndrome program. Staff members at the Hospital are certified pediatric specialists.

The Hospital accepts most insurance plans, federal or state assistance programs and offers reduced rate or free care. The Heasley House is a residence available to families who live more than fifty miles away. It is located in Squirrel Hill, and requires families to pay five dollars a night to reside there.

Inpatient services
The campus located in Squirrel Hill houses three units: two units focus on pediatric rehabilitation and the third specializes in Prader–Willi Syndrome. The facility has eighty-two inpatient beds. In the hospital, each patient is assigned to a team of therapists directed by a physician. Licensed nurses and healthcare workers give care twenty-four hours a day. The child and their family are assigned to a case manager who facilitates communication between caregivers and the family. Patients stay on average four weeks, but stays range from one to two weeks to four to six months.

The Hospital provides rehabilitation services. These include medical services, nutrition services, occupational therapy, physical therapy, psychology services, recreational therapy, and speech–language pathology.

The Squirrel Hill campus contains facilities and equipment. There are swimming pools used in recreation and therapy. Austin's playroom is used for children's developmental play and activities. There is an outdoor playground for day school students and inpatients that is utilized in therapy. A sensory room promotes intellectual activity and encourages relaxation for patients. There is a medical library on site.

CABLE stands for cognitive and behavioral learning environment, a school for inpatient children. It is an educational program that provides cognitive assessments for patients in kindergarten through twelfth grade.

Outpatient services
Outpatient services are scheduled depending on times and locations. Outpatient services are located in Squirrel Hill, as well as at the Children's Institute South location in Bridgeville, Pennsylvania, the East location in Norwin Hills, Pennsylvania, and the North location in Wexford, Pennsylvania.

Outpatient services include occupational therapy, physical therapy, speech and language therapy, clinical nutrition services, hearing evaluation, home accessibility evaluation, neuropsychology evaluation, special equipment evaluation, assistive technology, and augmentative communication.

Research
The Hospital at the Children's Institute of Pittsburgh conducts research for the development of pediatric rehabilitation. Dr. Scott Faber, a Neurodevelopmental Pediatrician at the Hospital, in his research, discovered "exceptionally low zinc-to-copper ratio in the blood of patients with autism." Results of the study were published in the scientific journal Biomarkers. Similar studies are now being conducted and planned to further this research. A pilot study conducted by the director of Physical Therapy, Christopher Joseph, MPT, in conjunction with Chatham University researched the treatment of RND, reflex neurovascular dystrophy. The results concluded that an "intensive exercise regimen enable significant increases in functional activity."

U.S. Senator Bob Casey, Jr. has helped secure funding for the Children's Institute of Pittsburgh. This funding has contributed to the creation of an autism center and pediatric unit, which treat children with Autism Spectrum Disorders. In 2010, the contributions also secured the purchase of research equipment for the study of environmental triggers of autism, to further the development of autism treatment.

Therapeutic garden
On April 22, 2010, two dogwood trees were planted during the private ground-breaking ceremony for the Children's Institute of the Pittsburgh Nimick Family Therapeutic garden. The ceremony was conducted by the Nimick Family in honor of the late Florence and Tommy Nimick. Tommy and Florence Nimick devoted their lives to working with children at the Children's Institute in Squirrel Hill. The garden is a gift from the Nimick Forbesway Foundation to remember the Nimick's long-term leadership at the Institute. "The Nimick Family Therapeutic Garden will assist in teaching, stimulating and soothing patients and their families, as well as educators, therapists and neighbors of The Children's Institute."
The garden is located near the front of the Squirrel Hill Campus along Shady Avenue. It hopes to feature: a tree house accessible by rope or ladder, a sun pavilion at the heart of the garden, various sculptures by world-famous sculptor Albert Guibara, a children's planting garden, and an engraved brick pathway throughout the garden. The therapeutic garden will not only be accessible to the families and their children at the Institute, but to the public.

Story behind the garden
The first garden at the Children's Institute was a victory garden in the 1900s. The Nimick garden will take its place as the Institute's Therapeutic Garden. "The Nimick Family Therapeutic Garden will use the outdoors in a way we've not been able to before and will reflect our commitment to respond to all the needs of our patients and their families" President and CEO, David K. Miles. Tommy Nimick was a member of the Men's Advisory Board at the Children's Institute and served on the board until his death in 2007. Florence Nimick was a long-term member of the Board of the Directors and served three terms as Board President at the Institute, which at the time was the Home for Crippled Children. She died in 1981. "We are proud to honor our parents in this way—and we believe that, if they were here, they would have made this gift themselves. The Children’s Institute was a great mutual interest for them, so much so that the three of us practically grew up there. As young children, we played and talked with staff and patients while our mother was signing papers, and later as teens my sister and I volunteered there."- Kit Nimick Carrasco.

Benefits of a therapeutic garden
Mind, body, and spirit are apparent themes from the Japanese Zen garden to the Monastic Cloister gardens that have been used throughout time for therapeutic reasons. The concept of unity is important in a therapeutic garden.  A "healing garden" must have simplicity, sequence, balance, and variety. Roger Ulrich, a professor and director of the Center for Health Systems and Design at Texas A & M University, discovered that people who have access to viewing natural scenes or elements are able to overcome stressful feelings, reduce negative emotions, and help with attention disorders. Test subjects exhibited lower alpha rates, linked to becoming relaxed, when viewing natural settings such as gardens instead of urban settings. Ulrich also showed surgical patients who were able to view nature in the form of gardens had shorter post-operative stays, took less pain medication, and experienced fewer post-operative complications.

Garden sculptures
Albert Guibara's sculptures have been selected to be featured in the Children's Institute's garden. Guibara has been sculpting for almost fifty years and sculpts in bronze. A lifelong resident of San Francisco, California, Guibara is most recognized for his sculptures of: the rabbits and banyan tree at the Grand Cafe, a swaybacked horse at the Hotel Monaco in San Francisco, and the manini and donkey fish and the intertwined wiliwili trees at the Kukio Resort in Kona, Hawaii.  Guibara is currently sculpting a sunflower pavilion for the Institute; this will lay at the heart of the garden and will represent hope and healing. He will make a wishing well for the children. A toad on lily pads with sunflowers will be sculpted. A 24 inch Jeremy Fisher Frog will be fishing on the lily pad together with the Institute’s signature sunflower umbrella; the sunflower umbrella will be featured in the garden. A sunflower trellis is being constructed to face Shady Avenue. Fourteen- to eighteen-inch mice, squirrels, and ducks are also being made.

Project STAR
Project STAR was created by The Children's Institute to assist and educate families about resources to make children's lives the best possible. This is done through family placement services, family preservation services, and family enrichment services. Project STAR is licensed by the Pennsylvania Department of Public Welfare as an adoption, foster care, and private children and youth social service agency. It is an affiliate member of the Statewide Adoption and Permanency Network (SWAN). There are two offices, one located in Pittsburgh, Pennsylvania, and one located in Monaca Pennsylvania.

Project STAR began in October 1985 as a collaborative effort of The Children's Institute, Three River's Adoption Council (TRAC), and Allegheny County Office of Children, Youth, and Families. The original goal was to find permanent homes for children with developmental disabilities. This has since expanded to all children in need of a home. The affiliates believed that children with developmental disabilities were adoptable under the conditions that families received full information about the child, education about the child's needs, and training specific to the child before adoption. The acronym STAR stood for Specialized Training for Adoption Readiness. In 1990, Project STAR was expanded with the opening of an office in Beaver County, Pennsylvania, to widen the range of children to assist.

The Holiday Gift Drive started in 1997 and provides presents for the children and families of Project STAR during the holidays. The gifts are distributed to all Project STAR families throughout Southwestern Pennsylvania. The gift drive accepts donations or sponsorship of a particular child through granting gifts on the child's wish list.

Family placement
Project STAR places children in adoption, foster care, or respite care situations depending on the child's particular needs. Their goal is to match a child with an appropriate resource family anywhere from a few days to on a permanent basis. Resource families are trained by the institution and are continuously assisted by the institution if necessary.

Resource families include individuals or families that partner with Project STAR to take in a child who needs a home. A man or woman 21 years of age or older is qualified to become a resource family. Project STAR does not discriminate in terms of marital status, number of other children, economic status, employment, or home ownership.

Family preservation and enrichment
Project STAR's goal with family preservation services is to keep the child with their birth family or to have the child returned to their birth family as soon as possible. Once preservation services receive a referral about a particular family, they examine the family and provide them with community resources to aid in the family's nutrition, discipline, and childhood development. Project STAR accepts referrals from offices of mental health and mental retardation, child welfare agencies, and families who choose to refer themselves.

Project PACT (Parents and Children Together) was created by Project STAR to maintain contact open between children temporarily removed from their homes and their birth parents. Visits are set up by staff at a supervised, neutral location. Parenting lessons are provided with each visit, and parents and welfare professionals are given feedback following each visit.

The goal of the family enrichment services is to make families stronger by providing ongoing support. Project STAR has open events of an educational and recreational matter for families throughout the year.

Post-Permanency Services are available to all families with an adopted child under the age of 18. Foster parents and legal guardians are able to participate in these services. Services include case evaluations, advocacy, respite care, and support groups.

Project STAR Awards
 2005 Congressional Angels in Adoption Award
 2004 Adoption Excellence Award for Support for Adoptive Families United States Department of Health and Human Services
 2000 Pennsylvania Department of Health Outstanding Provider Award for Services to Children and Families
 1999 SWAN (Pennsylvania Statewide Adoption Network) Hall of Fame Award for Child Specific Recruitment

Day School
The Day School at The Children's Institute of Pittsburgh is a private school that services children with disabilities such as autism, cerebral palsy, and brain damage. About 200 students, aged 2–21 years old, are currently enrolled. These students come from Allegheny and nearby counties. Transportation is provided by the students' parents or by the public school district in which the student resides. Students who are enrolled in the Day School are typically referred by their public school. The school day lasts from 8:30 a.m. to 3:00 p.m. and the school year lasts 180 days.

The Day School is an Approved Private School, which is licensed by the Pennsylvania Bureau of Private Academic Schools and is approved as a Special Education School by the Pennsylvania Department of Education. It is also fully accredited by the National Commission for the Accreditation of Special Education Services.

Most staff members hold master's degrees. Therapists are certified to work in Pennsylvania schools. The Day School's administrative staff holds certification as teachers, elementary or secondary school administrators, special education supervisors, or a combination of those credentials. Paraprofessionals hold a college degree or have received college training.

Services
Services are available for students, including: speech/language therapy, vision consultation, dietary services, psychological services, augmentative communication device therapy, hearing impaired resource therapy, functional feeding and oral motor therapy, occupational therapy, physical therapy, nursing services, and social work services.

The Day School has 25 classrooms, a gymnasium, a full-sized pool, a library, a sensory room, a multi-purpose room, and a treatment area for occupational, physical, and speech therapy. Classrooms host eight students, one teacher, and two paraprofessionals. In classrooms with autistic students, there are generally six children, one teacher, and two paraprofessionals.

Curriculum
Students have an individualized curriculum which aims to improve the students' life skills, in addition to teaching academic fundamentals, so that each student can learn to be independent. Parent involvement is encouraged. Students take adapted physical education, art, library, music, and (GYMBOP).  The class integrates music and physical education, which incorporates physical, occupational, and speech/language therapies. Movement activities include: rolling, balancing, sitting, reaching, swaying, stretching, standing, and walking, with and without the aid of equipment such as walkers, scooters, gait trainers, tricycles, benches, and standers. Activities aimed toward improving communication skills include: locating sounds, making eye contact, tracking objects, pointing, using simple switches, and following directions.

External links
 Children’s Institute of Pittsburgh website
 Children's Institute on the Albert Guibara website

References

Non-profit organizations based in Pittsburgh